Dan Michaelson and The Coastguards is a name under which singer-songwriter Dan Michaelson records and performs. They have previously stated that they are inspired by Leonard Cohen, Johnny Cash, Etta James and Dusty Springfield.

Following the release of Blindspot in 2013 and Sudden Fiction in 2011, the band released Distance in August 2014. Memory was released in May 2016.

Discography

Dan Michaelson
Albums

Singles

with Absentee

References

External links
Dan Michaelson and The Coastguards official site
Dan Michaelson and The Coastguards myspace page
The state51 Conspiracy official site
Official YouTube

English alternative rock groups